The Stadio Alberto Pinto is a municipal stadium in Caserta, Italy, located in the eastern part of the city and home ground of Casertana.

Owned by the Municipality of Caserta, it is essentially used for football matches, for athletics and for pop music concerts.

It has a capacity of 12,000 seats, however the stadium is currently approved for a capacity of 6,817 seats, arranged on 4 sectors: central covered and side uncovered grandstand, uncovered fronts grandstand, north curve. The south curve was pulled down during the renovation works for the 2019 Summer Universiade. In the autumn of 2020, the new synthetic grass lawn was built.

References

Stadio Alberto Pinto